The national emblem of Yemen depicts a golden eagle of Saladin with a scroll between its claws. The chest of the eagle contains a shield that depicts a coffee plant and the Marib Dam, with seven blue wavy stripes below. The flagstaffs on the right and left of the eagle hold the flag of Yemen.

Historical emblems

North Yemen
From 1945 to 1990, Yemen was split into North and South. The North had an emblem more similar to the present day one, and its shield has similarities with the shield of the former Mutawakkilite Kingdom of Yemen.

South Yemen
The South had an emblem with the pan-Arab "Eagle of Saladin" (similar to the coats of arms of Egypt, Iraq, and the former coats of arms of Libya and Syria).

Federation of South Arabia

Protectorate of South Arabia

Aden Colony

See also

Coat of arms of Egypt
Coat of arms of Iraq
Coat of arms of Palestine
Coat of arms of Syria
Coat of arms of Sudan
Coat of arms of Libya
Eagle of Saladin

References

External links 

 

National symbols of Yemen
Yemen
Yemen